Beit Iksa is a Palestinian village in the Jerusalem Governorate, located northwest of Jerusalem in the West Bank. 

The village is surrounded on all sides by the Israeli West Bank barrier, and outside Palestinians are denied access through the one Israeli checkpoint leading to it. In 2014 Israeli military authorities announced they would confiscate a further 3,167 acres of Beit Iksa lands, leaving the township, according to the village head, Saada al-Khatib, as a 2,500-dunum area.

Beit Iksa contains two primary schools run by the Palestinian National Authority. Students attending secondary school travel to Jerusalem or nearby towns for education.

Location
It is bordered by Beit Hanina al Balad and Shu'fat to the east, An Nabi Samwil  to the north, Beit Surik and Lifta to the west.

History
Beit Iksa lies on one of the historical routes that joined the Mediterranean coastal plain with Jerusalem, and archeological excavations have yielded remains from the Hellenistic, Early Roman, late Byzantine and Umayyad periods.

An alternative name for the site was Umm el-'Ela.

During the Crusader period, the village was known as Jenanara, according to its inhabitants.

Ottoman era
In 1517, the village was incorporated into the Ottoman empire with the rest of Palestine, and in the 1596 tax-records it appeared under the name of Bayt Kisa, located in the Nahiye of Jerusalem in the Sanjak of the Mutasarrifate of Jerusalem. It had a population of 79 households, all Muslims. The inhabitants paid a fixed tax rate of 33.3% on agricultural products, including wheat, barley, olive trees, vineyards, fruit trees, orchard, goats or bee hives, and a press for olives or grapes; a total of 18,000 akçe.

In 1838, Beit Iksa was noted as a Muslim village, part of the El-Kuds district. 

In 1841 a local leader (nāzir), Abd al-Qadir al-Khatib, built an Ottoman castle located in the southern part of the village, while one of his brother built a smaller version five years later.  In 1863, the French explorer Victor Guérin passed by the village and was told it had 300 inhabitants. He noted that the surroundings were cultivated with vines and olive trees. An Ottoman village list of about 1870 showed that "Bet Iksa" had 70 houses and a population of 147, though the population count included only men. According to Charles Simon Clermont-Ganneau, he was informed in 1874 that the inhabitant belonged to the Beni Zeid tribe and that the village earlier had been named Umm el Ela.

In 1883, the PEF's Survey of Western Palestine described it as a "village of moderate size, with stone houses, and a well on the north, near which is a tree sacred to an otherwise unknown prophet, Nabī Leimûun. There are a few olives round the village."

Around 1896 the population of Beit Iksa was estimated to be about 714 persons.

British Mandate era
In the 1922 census of Palestine conducted by the British Mandate authorities, "Bait Iksa" had a population of 791, all Muslims, increasing in the 1931 census to a population of 1003, in 221 houses.

In the 1945 statistics, Beit Iksa had a population of 1,410, all Muslims,   with 8,179 dunams of land, according to an official land and population survey. Of this, 1,427 dunams were plantations and irrigable land, 2,690 used for cereals, while 43 dunams were built-up (urban) land.

Jordanian era
In April 1948, most of the villagers fled following the fall of Deir Yassin and the Haganah entered the village destroying many buildings.
In the wake of the 1948 Arab–Israeli War, and after the 1949 Armistice Agreements, Beit Iksa came under Jordanian rule. It was annexed by Jordan in 1950.

In 1961, the population of Beit Iksa was  1,177.

After 1967
Since the Six-Day War in 1967, Beit Iksa has been under Israeli occupation. 

After the 1995 accords, 7.4% of village land was classified as Area B, the remaining 92.6% as Area C. Over half of the land lies beyond the confines of the West Bank separation barrier. 
 

The majority of the present population came to the village as refugees in the wake of the Six Day War, when its original inhabitants were forced to flee. In November 2014, Israeli authorities delivered a notification to the village, declaring the intention of confiscating 12,852 dunums (3,176 acres) of their land, including the areas of Haraeq al-Arab, Thahr Biddu, Numus, and Khatab. The given reason for the confiscation states that the land is required "for military purposes". Landholders were given until 31 December 2017 to remain on their land.
Israeli settlements, including Ramot, have been built on 1,500 dunums (371 acres) on village land, and according to the village major, the order came through after the Israel government announced plans for a further 244 housing units to be built in Ramot. In addition, Israel has confiscated 15 dunums for the Israeli settlement of Har Samuel, part of the Giv'at Ze'ev settlement.

Population
According to the Palestinian Central Bureau of Statistics (PCBS), Beit Iksa had a population of approximately 1,600 inhabitants in mid-year 2006. From the population, over 80% are Palestinian refugees. By 2014 the population had grown to some 1,700.

According to the land researcher Sami Hadawi, the population grew to 1,410 in 1945. However, following Israel's occupation after the 1967 Six-Day War, Beit Iksa counted 633 inhabitants, due to the number of residents that fled the village. Most of the village's inhabitants hold Palestinian ID cards and live in Beit Iksa's built-up area of 417 dunams or 5.4% of the village's total land area of 7,734 dunams.

Shrines
In the 1920, Tawfiq Canaan noted several shrines, or maqams here. Es-seh Mbarak/Imbarak had one in the public cemetery, with a niche, for holding oil-lamps, etc, in the northern side of the shrine.

A shrine for  Sheik Hasan was badly damaged during WWI.

A shrine for  Sheik Iteyim was also used as a madafeh, or guest room, in addition to being used as a school room.

References

Bibliography

 (p. 222)

   

  p. 400

External links
 Official website
 Welcome To Bayt Iksa
Survey of Western Palestine, Map 17:    IAA, Wikimedia commons
 Beit Iksa Village (Fact Sheet), Applied Research Institute–Jerusalem, ARIJ
 Beit Iksa Village Profile, ARIJ
 Beit Iksa aerial photo, ARIJ
 Locality Development Priorities and Needs in Beit Iksa, ARIJ
 January 1, 1995 :"Minaret of Arab village of Beit Iksa confronts Jewish district of Ramot."
 May 17, 2006 :"Beit Iksa village loses its lands for the Israeli Segregation Wall"
 December 8, 2006: "Beit Iksa: the making of another ghetto"
 January 16, 2007 :"Israel hits Beit Iksa, Nabi Samuel and Beit Surik with new military order in favor of the Segregation Wall"
 August 17, 2008: "The Zionist La Passionara" (extensive reference within a bigger article)
 August 4, 2009 :"Israel annexes Palestinian village near Jerusalem"
  December 17, 2010: Israel Decides To Confiscate 50 Dunams In East Jerusalem
  July 21, 2011: Troops Uproot Olive Orchards Near Jerusalem

Villages in the West Bank
Jerusalem Governorate
Throne villages
Municipalities of the State of Palestine